The Longines World's Best Racehorse Rankings (LWBRR), known as World Thoroughbred Racehorse Rankings (WTRR) before 2012, are horseracing's equivalent to World Rankings by other major sporting organizations such as ATP Tennis Rankings, World Golf Rankings, FIFA World Rankings for soccer and IRB Rugby World Rankings. The Longines Rankings are based on the rating earned by horses running worldwide from North and South America, Europe, Middle East, South Africa, Asia through to Australia and New Zealand.

The ratings are compiled under the auspices of The International Federation of Horseracing Authorities (IFHA) by racing officials & handicappers representing the five continents who compile the ranking order by agreeing on the rating for each horse. The ratings are based on the performance of horses in elite races held during the designated period which takes in account the quality of opposition and achievements of each horse. The annual rankings denote the champions in the various distance categories for example sprint or mile, surface either turf or dirt/artificial and also the fillies & mares category.

According to the IFHA website, "The IFHA World Thoroughbred Racehorse Rankings are the official assessment of the top performers." In 1977, France, Great Britain and Ireland published the first internationally agreed assessment of racing merit on behalf of the European Pattern Committee under the banner of the International Classifications. In 1985, Germany and Italy joined the system, to be followed by North America (both Canada and the United States) and Japan in the mid 1990s.

The Longines World's Best Racehorse Rankings measure a given horse's peak performance during the year. Throughout the year the Longines Rankings are published at regular intervals and the final annual rankings are released in January. The three highest-rated horses are honored during the Longines World's Best Racehorse and Longines World's Best Horse Race Ceremony.

Related Awards

The ratings for the horses also help establish two other awards: the aforementioned Longines World's Best Horse Race and the Longines World's Best Jockey. The Longines World’s Best Horse Race award recognizes the best-rated race of the highest-rated Group 1 international races as established by a panel of international handicappers. The ratings of the top four finishers in each race serve as basis for the assessment. Introduced in 2015, the award was won by the Prix de l'Arc de Triomphe in 2015, 2017, 2018, 2019, and 2021. The Breeders' Cup Classic won in 2016 and 2022, while in 2020, the Juddmonte International won the title. Additionally, the IFHA releases the top 100 Group/Grade 1 races each year.

The Longines World's Best Jockey is named each December. The top 100 Group 1 and Grade 1 races serve as the base of this annual competition to recognize top jockeys throughout the world. Frankie Dettori has won the award four times, as he was named the Longines World’s Best Jockey in 2015, 2018, 2019, and 2020. Hugh Bowman won the title in 2017, while Ryan Moore took the inaugural contest in 2014 as well as the 2016 and 2021 editions. James McDonald won the title in 2022.

Top ranked horses
 Horse names are followed by a suffix indicating the country where foaled.

References

External links
International Federation of Horseracing Authorities 

 
Horse racing awards